was a Japanese daimyō of the late Edo period, who ruled as the ninth lord of the Takamatsu Domain.

Yorihiro ordered Mifuyu Tomoyasu, a scholar of Kokugaku (National Learning), to compile a book called Rekicho Yoki, and he presented it to the Imperial court.

One of Yorihiro's sons was Ōkubo Tadanori. His descendant Yorihiro Matsudaira, named after him, was a notable figure of Japanese Scouting and recipient of the Bronze Wolf.

References

https://web.archive.org/web/20120212202052/http://www.city.takamatsu.kagawa.jp/kyouiku/bunkabu/rekisi/NAIYOU/yuisyo/kakukou/matu.htm
http://www.kcn-net.org/bunjo/eishoji/okatsu.htm
http://omugio.exblog.jp/page/54/ samurai jp
http://www.wul.waseda.ac.jp/kotenseki/search.php?cndbn=%95%BD%96%EC+%8C%BA%8A%B2

Daimyo
Matsudaira clan
Mito-Tokugawa family
1842 deaths
1798 births